Bulcsú (or  Vérbulcsú; died 10 August 955) was a Hungarian chieftain, one of the military leaders of prince Taksony of Hungary, a descendant of Árpád. He held the title of horka. He was one of the most important figures of the Hungarian invasions of Europe. During these military campaigns, the Magyars threatened much of Western Europe; therefore a common saying at that time was "A sagittis Hungarorum, libera nos Domine" (Lord, save us from the arrows of the Hungarians") Modena, 925 CE . After his army had lost the disastrous Battle of Lechfeld in 955, he was caught by the German victors and executed.

References 

955 deaths
10th-century Hungarian people
Magyar tribal chieftains
Hungarian soldiers
Executed Hungarian people
Year of birth unknown